Fawad Hasan Fawad (born 14 January 1960) is a retired Pakistani civil servant who served in BPS-22 grade as the Principal Secretary to two Prime Ministers, Nawaz Sharif and Shahid Khaqan Abbasi. Fawad belongs to the Pakistan Administrative Service and is batchmates with Zafarullah Khan (PAS), Sikandar Sultan Raja (PAS), Rizwan Ahmed (PAS), Jawad Rafique Malik (PAS) and Allah Dino Khawaja (PSP). 

His work during his tenure as the Principal Secretary to the Prime Minister of Pakistan from November 2015 to June 2018 was largely focused on the fruition of the China–Pakistan Economic Corridor, effectively spearheading multiple infrastructure and energy projects and directing sector-wide investment across the nation.

Fawad was promoted to the rank of Federal Secretary in December 2017.

Career

Public service
Fawad belongs to the Pakistan Administrative Service, formerly referred to as the District Management Group and served as Director General of the Civil Services Academy from 1 June 2018 to 5 July 2018. Before joining the Civil Services Academy as Director General, he served as Principal Secretary to two Prime Ministers, Shahid Khaqan Abbasi and Nawaz Sharif. Fawad also served as Punjab's Provincial Secretary for Health, Communication & Works as well as held other portfolios. 

Fawad has served in the Government of Pakistan, Government of Punjab and Government of Balochistan. He is batchmates with Zafarullah Khan (PAS), Shoaib Mir (PAS), Sikandar Sultan Raja (PAS), Tahir Hussain (PAS), Rizwan Ahmed (PAS), Suleman Khan (PSP), Jawad Rafique Malik (PAS) and Allah Dino Khawaja (PSP).

Fawad served as Secretary to Chief Minister Punjab (Implementation), and Punjab from July 2012 to April 2013. Fawad served as Joint Secretary, Economic Affairs Division from April 2013 to 4 June 2013. From July 1994 to March 1997, Fawad Hasan Fawad served as Deputy Commissioner Quetta and Lahore; being the youngest individual to do so in Pakistan's history. He also served as Principal Staff Officer to Principal Secretary to Prime Minister of Pakistan and Deputy Secretary to Chief Secretary Balochistan. Earlier, he served as Assistant Commissioner in Quetta and Hub from August 1989 to January 1993.

Private sector
His services in the financial sector included his appointment as Senior Group Advisor to the JS Group, Executive-in-Charge Infrastructure Development Division Bank Alfalah Limited from August 2005 to November 2006.

Corruption allegations and arrest
Fawad Hasan Fawad was accused of corruption and misuse of authority by Pakistan's National Accountability Bureau (NAB) in the Ashiana Housing scam. He was arrested by NAB on 6 July 2018 in the Ashiana Housing scam criminal investigation and was sent on fourteen days physical remand by an accountability court in Lahore. He directed the PLDC management to cancel the contract of Ashiana Iqbal without any inquiry. On 14 February 2019 the Lahore High Court division bench comprising Justice Malik Shahzad Ahmad Khan and Justice Mirza Viqas Rauf also granted bail to Fawad, former implementation secretary to the chief minister, in the Ashiana Housing scam, but denied him bail in another NAB reference relating to assets beyond means. On 21 January 2020 Fawad was granted bail in the Assets case by the Lahore High Court by a two-judge bench comprising Justice Muhammad Tariq Abbasi and Justice Chaudhry Mushtaq, on the grounds that no illegitimate asset belonging to him had been unearthed by the National Accountability Bureau (NAB), no charge had been framed against him and that there was no nexus between him and any asset, however he had been arrested at the inquiry stage.

On the 2nd of February 2022 Fawad was acquitted of all charges in the assets beyond means and the Ashiana Housing scams on merit due to irrefutable documentary evidence provided on the prosecution witnesses. His acquital goes to show that the National Accountability Bureau was used to target and persecute civil servants and politicians to manipulate the democratic set-up over the years.

Books
Kunj-e-Qafas  published in February 2023. A profound piece of poetry that reflects on Fawad's journey from a passionate public-speaker in his youth to a prisoner of conscience at the peak of his public service career, who was punished for his commitment to transparency and the rule of law. His poetry symbolises the transformation of Pakistan through the last five decades espousing a romantic self-belief at the start to a yearning for liberty of speech and thought in today’s Pakistan. 

His verses are composed in the finest traditions of Urdu language which appear to draw inspiration from the likes of Ghalib, Faiz Ahmed Faiz, Ahmed Faraz and Habib Jalib.

See also
Government of Pakistan
Akbar Bugti
Ashtar Ausaf Ali
Maleeha Lodhi
Jahangir Siddiqui
Khurshid Hasan Khurshid

References

Living people
1960 births
Alumni of King's College London
Principal Secretary to the Prime Minister of Pakistan
Pakistani civil servants
Punjabi people
Pakistani people of Kashmiri descent
Chevening Scholars